Kelly Gallagher may refer to:
 Kelly Gallagher (alpine skier), British alpine skier
 Kelly Wearstler (born 1967), interior designer and former Playboy model (under the pseudonym Gallagher)